Kalang River, a perennial river of the Bellinger River catchment, is located in the Mid North Coast region of New South Wales, Australia.

Course and features
Kalang River rises within the Great Dividing Range, near Brinerville, and flows generally east before reaching its mouth at the Tasman Sea of the South Pacific Ocean, east of Urunga. The river descends  over its  course.

Parts of the Kalang River are contained within the Bellinger River National Park.

Towards its mouth, the river is transversed by the Pacific Highway, near Urunga.

See also

 Rivers of New South Wales
 List of rivers of Australia

References

External links
 

 

Rivers of New South Wales
Mid North Coast